Rhine Gold is the second studio album by Copenhagen-based Danish chamber pop band Choir of Young Believers, released in Europe on February 27, 2012, on Tigerspring and in the United States on March 20, 2012, on Ghostly International.

Critical reception

Rhine Gold received largely positive reviews from contemporary music critics. At Metacritic, which assigns a normalized rating out of 100 to reviews from mainstream critics, the album received an average score of 77, based on 18 reviews, which indicates "generally favorable reviews".

Austin Trunick of Under the Radar praised the album, stating, "Rhine Gold manages to sound little like anything else that's arrived in recent years. With lead singer Makrigiannis' aloof vocals daringly clearing trails through swaths of rich synthesizer and grandiose orchestral pop accompaniment, it stealthily slips into a sea of cool detachment rarely heard since David Bowie's Berlin period, particularly in the funky outsider vibe given off on Low. At its most morose, it recalls the weary, sun-faded blues of Dennis Wilson's Pacific Ocean Blue. Riveting and unpredictable across multiple plays, Choir of Young Believers has expanded upon the blueprint outlined on their well-crafted first album and channeled it into a sophomore release that's really outstanding."

Eric Harvey of Pitchfork Media gave the album a positive review, stating, "Choir of Young Believers have created a singular sonic world all their own. They don't let you get comfortable for too long at a stretch, but their itchy curiosity is its own reward."

Track listing

Personnel
Main personnel
 Jannis Noya Makrigiannis – vocals, guitar, keyboard
 Jakob Millung – bass, lap steel guitar, backing vocals
 Cæcilie Trier – cello, backing vocals
 Lasse Herbst – percussion
 Casper Henning Hansen – drums
 Bo Rande – horns, keyboard, backing vocals
 Sonja Labianca – keyboard, saxophone
 Jeppe Brix Sørensen – guitar (5)
 Aske Zidore – additional guitar
 Nis Bysted – additional guitar
 Rune Borup – keyboard (5)

Additional personnel
 Anders Schumann – mastering (5)
 Mikkel Gemzøe – mastering (5)
 Aske Zidore – production (1-4, 6–9), recording (1-4, 6–9), mixing (1-4, 6–9)
 Nis Bysted – production (1-4, 6–9), recording (1-4, 6–9), mixing (1-4, 6–9)
 Rune Borup – recording (5)
 Jannis Noya Makrigiannis – artwork
 Nis Bysted – artwork
 Nis Sigurdsson – artwork
 Cæcilie Trier – photography
 Frederik Sølberg – photography
 Peter Bysted – photography

References

Choir of Young Believers albums
2012 albums
Ghostly International albums
Tigerspring albums